The 1970 Rhode Island gubernatorial election was held on November 3, 1970. Incumbent Democrat Frank Licht narrowly defeated Republican nominee Herbert F. DeSimone with 50.07% of the vote.

Primary elections
Primary elections were held on September 15, 1970.

Republican primary

Candidates
Herbert F. DeSimone, Attorney General of Rhode Island
Raymond W. Monaco

Results

General election

Candidates
Major party candidates
Frank Licht, Democratic
Herbert F. DeSimone, Republican 

Other candidates
John E. Powers, Independent

Results

References

1970
Rhode Island
Gubernatorial